Reversed Image Unlimited is a record label featuring electronic, rock and pop artists. Located in Cleveland, Ohio, Reversed Image is owned and operated by multi-platinum award-winning producer, engineer, arranger, and composer Michael Seifert. Reversed Image's releases for 2009 include Love Kills (May 5) by THIS IS A SHAKEDOWN! and Will Rap Over Hard Rock For Food (August 11) by Chuck Mosley.

References

(2009-07-24)  Former Faith No More Vocalist Returns With First Solo CD Retrieved 2009-11-20
Stevenson, Katie (2009-05-26) Q & A: Leah Lou Emerging Young Artist Set to Release First Album Next Year Retrieved 2009-11-20
Bliss, Karen (2009-10-01) Chuck Mosley Has Eclecticism in His Genes Retrieved 2009-11-20 
Pantsios, Anastasia (2009-05-27) This Is a Shakedown mixes punk energy and electronics-driven rock Retrieved 2009-11-20

External links
Reversed Image Unlimited

American record labels
Companies based in Cleveland